Tarapur Atomic Power Station (T.A.P.S.) is located in Tarapur, Palghar, India. It was the first commercial nuclear power station built in India.

History

Tarapur Atomic Power Station was constructed initially with two boiling water reactor (BWR) units under the 1963 123 Agreement between India, the United States, and the International Atomic Energy Agency (IAEA). It was built for the Department of Atomic Energy by GE and Bechtel. Units 1 and 2 were brought online for commercial operation on 28 October 1969 with an initial power of 210 MW of electricity. Later on this was reduced to 160 MW due to technical difficulties. These were the first of their kind in Asia.

More recently, an additional two pressurised heavy water reactor (PHWR) units of 540 MW each were constructed by BHEL, L&T and Gammon India, seven months ahead of schedule and well within the original cost estimates.  Unit 3 was brought online for commercial operation on 18 August 2006, and unit 4 on 12 September 2005.

The facility is operated by the NPCIL (Nuclear Power Corporation of India).

The personnel operating the power plant live in a residential complex called T. A. P. S. colony,  which is a fifteen-minute drive from Boisar, the nearest railway station. The residential complex was also constructed by Bechtel to house both Indian and American employees. Due to this, the residential complex has a very Indian small-town look, with neat sidewalks, spacious houses, a club with tennis courts, swimming pool, a commissary etc.

In 1974 after India conducted Smiling Buddha, its first nuclear weapons test the West chose to no longer honour its agreement to supply the plant with enriched uranium. Nuclear fuel for TAPS has subsequently been delivered from France, China and Russia under IAEA safeguards.

The residential colony features 3 central schools namely - Atomic Energy Central School No. 1 (AECS-1), Atomic Energy Central School No. 2 (AECS-2) and Atomic Energy Central School No. 3 (AECS-3), all running under Atomic Energy Education Society (AEES). 

Units

Incidents
During maintenance of Tarapur-1, a blast occurred which damaged the chimney. Tarapur-2 was subsequently shut down to avoid any potential issues, completely shutting down the power generation capability of Phase-1 of TAPS in January 2020.

Safety concerns
The Boiling water reactors (BWRs) at Tarapur 1 and 2 units are similar to the reactors involved in the Fukushima Daiichi nuclear disaster. The age of the reactors, coupled with their old design, have raised safety concerns and, according to one local leader in 2011, the reactors had already been in operation for 16 years longer than their design lives.

In 2007, Atomic Energy Regulatory Board (AERB) evaluated seismic safety features at Tarapur 1 and 2 and reported many shortfalls, following which NPCIL installed seismic sensors. In 2011, AERB formed a 10-member committee, consisting of experts from Indian Institutes of Technology (IIT) and India Meteorological Department (IMD), to assess the vulnerability of the Tarapur to earthquakes and tsunamis. A. Gopalakrishnan, former director of AERB, said that since Tarapur's reactors are much older than the Fukushima units, they should be immediately decommissioned.

See also

 Advanced Fuel Fabrication Facility
 Nuclear power in India
 List of Indian Nuclear Reactors
 Map showing nuclear plants in India

References

Nuclear power stations in Maharashtra
Nuclear power stations using boiling water reactors
Heavy water reactors
Palghar district
1969 establishments in Maharashtra